Ultimate Brain is a British game show on CBBC about science. It is hosted by Duncan Wisbey as Dr. Brain, a monkey scientist and stars Imran Yusuf as Guinea Pig (also known as GP). Series 1 began on 26 June 2014, series 2 began on 15 August 2015 with a new set and series 3 began on 23 July 2016. It is Zig Zag Productions' first children's series.

Format
Three teams compete in each episode. Two teams (green and yellow) are made up of 10–12 year old children. One team (blue) is made up of 'celebrities', often from another CBBC show. The teams compete in various different scientific challenges and quizzes. The winning team take home the Ultimate Brain trophy.

Cast
 Duncan Wisbey as Dr. Brain
 Imran Yusuf as Guinea Pig (GP)

Episodes

Series 1 (2014)

Series 2 (2015)

Series 3 (2016)

References

External links

2014 British television series debuts
2016 British television series endings
2010s British game shows
BBC children's television shows
BBC high definition shows
BBC television game shows
English-language television shows